Well Done 3 is a mixtape (a third installment of this whole series) by American rapper Tyga. It was released on August 19, 2012, by Young Money Entertainment and Cash Money Records. The mixtape features guest appearances from 2 Chainz, Honey Cocaine, a Brick Squad Monopoly member Joe Moses, Kirko Bangz, D-Lo, Game and Future. The mixtape received a diamond certification from its DatPiff website, with over 1,000,000 downloads.

The mixtape contains several freestyles, including Rick Ross's "Diced Pineapples" (from his sixth album God Forgives, I Don't), E-40's "Function" (from his sixteenth album The Block Brochure: Welcome to the Soil 2), as well as Kanye West's single "Mercy" (from G.O.O.D. Music's collaboration album Cruel Summer), 2 Chainz' "Riot" (from his mixtape T.R.U. REALigion and his debut album Based on a T.R.U. Story), his label-mate Nicki Minaj's "I Am Your Leader" (from her second album Pink Friday: Roman Reloaded) and Game's "I Remember" (in which later included on his fifth album Jesus Piece, featuring Young Jeezy and Future). On this track "I Remember", Jeezy's verse was  replaced by Tyga's verse, making it his own song.

Track listing

References

2012 mixtape albums
Tyga albums
Albums produced by Hit-Boy
Albums produced by Tyler, the Creator
Albums produced by DJ Mustard
Sequel albums